Loudoun Valley Estates is a census-designated place (CDP) in Loudoun County, Virginia, United States. The population as of the 2010 United States Census was 3,656. It is a Toll Brothers community located near the planned Ashburn Metro station complex and Moorefield Station town center in the southern part of Ashburn, Virginia. Loudoun Valley Estates is governed by a homeowners' association.

It was formerly part of the county planning commission's Urban Policy Area but has been removed. The community is served by the Loudoun County Parkway.

Geography
Loudoun Valley Estates is in southeastern Loudoun County and is bordered by Brambleton to the south and west, Broadlands and Moorefield to the north, and the runways of Dulles International Airport to the east.

The community is drained by Broad Run, a northeast-flowing tributary of the Potomac River.

The land around Loudoun Valley Estates is gently rolling. The population density is about 500 people per square kilometer.

The climate is humid subtropical.

Demographics
According to the 2010 census, Loudoun Valley Estates had a population of 3,656. Of this, 29.3% were white; 4.2% African American; 0.3% were American Indians and Alaska Natives; 61% were Asian; 0.0% Hawaiians and other Pacific Islanders; 1.1% from another race, and 4.1% from two or more races. 3.3% of the total population were Hispanic or Latino of any race.

Notable residents
Survivor contestant Reem Daly lives in Loudoun Valley Estates.

References

Census-designated places in Loudoun County, Virginia
Washington metropolitan area
Census-designated places in Virginia